Echinopsis atacamensis (cardón) is a species of cactus from Chile, Argentina and Bolivia.  The wood of this species can be used in building and in making furniture.

Description

Echinopsis atacamensis has a tall columnar habit, sometimes forming branches and becoming treelike.

Systematics

Echinopsis atacamensis was first described by Rodolfo Philippi as Cereus atacamensis in 1860. It was placed in a number of genera, including Trichocereus and Helianthocereus, before being moved to Echinopsis by Helmo Friedrich and Gordon Rowley in 1974.

There are two recognized subspecies.

References

atacamensis
Cacti of South America
Flora of Argentina
Flora of Bolivia
Flora of northern Chile
Atacama Desert
Near threatened flora of South America
Plants described in 1860